Mario Román (born 16 January 1991 in Spain), is an Extreme Enduro rider.

His achievements include winning the EL INKA hard enduro 2019 - Peru, Hell's Gate Metzeler 2018, Alestrem 2018, Toyota Porto Extreme XL Lagares, in Portugal 2019, tenth edition of Sea to Sky.

Mario Roman is a Factory Team Rider for Sherco racing factory.

References 

Living people
1991 births
Spanish motorcycle racers
Off-road motorcycle racers